Waterman is a village in DeKalb County, Illinois, United States. The population was 1,433 at the 2020 census.

The village was known for the "Waterman and Western" train line that operates in Lion's Club Park.  This 1/3 scale train line comprises a 1/2 mile train line circling the park and is a hobby of a local resident.

Geography
Waterman is located at  (41.770971, -88.774697).

Demographics
As of the 2020 census there were 1,433 people, 570 households, and 407 families residing in the village. The racial makeup of the village was 88.28% White, 1.33% African American, 0.35% Native American, 0.77% Asian, 3.42% from other races, and 5.86% from two or more races. Hispanic or Latino of any race were 8.79% of the population.

There were 570 households, out of which 74.56% had children under the age of 18 living with them, 61.40% were married couples living together, 4.56% had a female householder with no husband present, and 28.60% were non-families. 24.39% of all households were made up of individuals, and 8.77% had someone living alone who was 65 years of age or older. The average household size was 3.63 and the average family size was 3.05.

The village's age distribution consisted of 26.8% under the age of 18, 11.7% from 18 to 24, 29.8% from 25 to 44, 23.2% from 45 to 64, and 8.3% who were 65 years of age or older. The median age was 36.5 years. For every 100 females, there were 70.1 males. For every 100 females age 18 and over, there were 80.1 males.

The median income for a household in the village was $82,500, and the median income for a family was $94,875. Males had a median income of $60,000 versus $27,500 for females. The per capita income for the village was $30,742. About 5.2% of families and 9.4% of the population were below the poverty line, including 13.9% of those under age 18 and 8.3% of those age 65 or over.

References

Villages in DeKalb County, Illinois
Villages in Illinois